BOLD-100, or sodium trans-[tetrachlorobis (1H-indazole)ruthenate(III)], is a ruthenium-based anti-cancer therapeutic in clinical development. As of November 2021, BOLD-100 was being tested in a Phase 1b clinical trial in patients with advanced gastrointestinal cancers in combination with the chemotherapy regimen FOLFOX. BOLD-100 is being developed by Bold Therapeutics Inc.

Structure 
BOLD-100 has an octahedral structure with two trans indazoles and four chloride ligands in the equatorial plane. The primary cation for BOLD-100 is sodium. BOLD-100’s impurity profile contains trace quantities of cesium

BOLD-100 derivatives 
BOLD-100 is sodium trans-[tetrachlorobis (1H-indazole) ruthenate(III)] with cesium as an intermediate salt form. BOLD-100 was developed from the closely related ruthenium molecule KP1339 (also known as IT-139 or NKP-1339) which is also sodium trans-[tetrachlorobis (1H-indazole) ruthenate(III)], but has different manufacturing methods and purity profiles. The names are often used interchangeably.

The precursor molecule to BOLD-100 is KP1019, which is the indazole salt equivalent. KP1019 previously entered Phase 1 clinical trials but development was halted due to low solubility in water, leading to the development of KP1339 and BOLD-100 which are readily soluble in water. KP1019 and KP1339 were invented by Dr. Keppler at the University of Vienna.

Synthesis 
Synthesis of BOLD-100 is accomplished by treating RuCl3 with an excess of 1H-indazole in a concentrated aqueous HCl solution. The resulting indazolium salt is treated with CsCl, and a salt exchange is performed that converts the cesium salt to the final sodium salt. The drug product is prepared as a lyophilized powder for parenteral administration.

Mechanism of action 
BOLD-100 kills cancer cells through multiple mechanisms, leading to cell death through apoptosis. BOLD-100 inhibits GRP78 and alters the unfolded protein response (UPR), while also inducing reactive oxygen species (ROS), leading to DNA damage.
BOLD-100 can synergize with cytotoxic chemotherapies and targeted agents to improve cancer cell death.
BOLD-100 also causes immunogenic cell death in colon cancer organoids.

Clinical development 
The precursor molecule to BOLD-100, KP1339 was tested in a Phase 1 monotherapy clinical trial in heavily pretreated patients with advanced cancers. In this dose escalation study, KP1339 was administered to 46 patients with doses ranging from 20 mg/m2 to 780 mg/m2. KP1339 was well tolerated, with the treatment-emergent adverse events occurring in >20% of patients being nausea, fatigue, vomiting, anaemia and dehydration. These adverse events were mainly grade 2 or lower. In the 38 efficacy-evaluable patients, nine patients achieved stable disease and 1 patient had a durable partial response. 625 mg/m2 was determined to be the recommended Phase 2 dose.
BOLD-100 is being tested in a Phase 1b clinical trial in combination with the chemotherapy regimen FOLFOX (5-fluorouracil, leucovorin, and oxaliplatin) for the treatment of gastrointestinal cancers, including gastric, pancreatic, colon and bile duct cancer. This trial includes a dose escalation phase followed by a cohort expansion and is expected to enroll 80 patients.

References 

Experimental cancer drugs
Ruthenium complexes
Indazoles
Chlorides
Ruthenium(IV) compounds